Jay Vijayan (born, Jayaprakash Vijayan) is an Indian-American business executive. From 2012 to 2016, he worked at Tesla Motors as Chief Information Officer. In 2016, he founded Tekion Corp, an American company selling software to the automotive retail industry.

Early life and education 
Jay was born in a Tamil family in Chennai, India to K. Vijayan and V. Umadevi. His father is a local politician and leader of the Indian National Congress party in Tamil Nadu.

He later earned his Bachelor of Science and Master in Science in Geology subject from the University of Madras in Chennai, India.

Career 
Prior to joining VMware, Jay led product development teams responsible for developing and managing ERP products at Oracle.

From 2007 to 2012, Vijayan worked at VMware, an American software company, as the director of Applications Development and later senior director of Business Applications, Information Technology. During his time at VMware, Vijayan led the technical implementation of VMware's ERP and CRM systems among others.

Jay joined Tesla, Inc. (then name Tesla Motors) in 2012 as a Chief Information Officer.

In July 2014, Vijayan received the Tamil American Pioneer – Lifetime Achievement Award for Excellence in Engineering/Science by the Federation of Tamil Sangams of North American.

In early 2016, Vijayan left Tesla to found Tekion Corp, a SaaS company that operated in stealth mode up until late 2019. Tekion is a cloud technology company focusing on business applications currently aimed at automobile retail industry. In 2020, Tekion Corp raised $150 million as part of its series C funding round led by private equity firm Advent International.

Jay also serves on the board of the HyreCar, a peer-to-peer car sharing marketplace and NIC Inc., a digital government service provider for federal and state governments of the United States.

Personal life

Vijayan lives in San Francisco with his wife and two children.

References

Year of birth missing (living people)
University of Madras alumni
Businesspeople from Chennai
American people of Indian Tamil descent